Calumma peltierorum, Peltier's chameleon, is a species of chameleon found in Madagascar.

References

Calumma
Reptiles of Madagascar
Reptiles described in 2006
Taxa named by Christopher John Raxworthy
Taxa named by Ronald Archie Nussbaum